Peter Kern (13 February 1949 – 26 August 2015) was an Austrian actor, film director, screenwriter, and producer. He appeared in more than 70 films and directed a further 25. He starred in the 1978 film Flaming Hearts, which was entered into the 28th Berlin International Film Festival. In 1980, he was a member of the jury at the 30th Berlin International Film Festival.

Two of Kern's later films, Blutsfreundschaft (2008) and Mörderschwestern (2011), featured Helmut Berger in a starring role. His last film was The Last Summer of the Rich ("Der letzte Sommer der Reichen"), which screened at the Berlin Film Festival in 2015.

Selected filmography

 Ludwig: Requiem for a Virgin King (dir. Hans-Jürgen Syberberg, 1972), as Lakai Mayr, court barber Hoppe, and Röhm
  (dir. Daniel Schmid, 1972), as Actor
  (dir. Peer Raben, 1972, TV film), as Innkeeper
 Schattenreiter (dir. George Moorse, 1974), as Tony
 La Paloma (dir. Daniel Schmid, 1974), as Count Isidor Palewski
 The Wrong Move (dir. Wim Wenders, 1975), as Bernhard Landau
 Fox and His Friends (dir. Rainer Werner Fassbinder, 1975), as Fatty Schmidt, flower salesman
 Mother Küsters' Trip to Heaven (dir. Rainer Werner Fassbinder, 1975), as Night club owner
 The Sternstein Manor (dir. Hans W. Geißendörfer, 1976), as Toni Stadlhofer
  (dir. Hans W. Geißendörfer, 1976), as Hjalmar Ekdal
 Group Portrait with a Lady (dir. Aleksandar Petrović, 1977), as Werner Hoyser
 Kleinhoff Hotel (dir. Carlo Lizzani, 1977), as Erich Müller
 Hitler: A Film from Germany (dir. Hans-Jürgen Syberberg, 1977), as Murderer from "M", Puppeteer, Mr. Ellerkamp, SS-Man, and Director of tourism
 Flaming Hearts (dir. Walter Bockmayer, 1978), as Peter Huber
 Despair (dir. Rainer Werner Fassbinder, 1978), as Müller
 Bella Donna (dir. Peter Keglevic, 1983)
 The Roaring Fifties (dir. Peter Zadek, 1983), as Franz Arnusch
 Joan of Arc of Mongolia (dir. Ulrike Ottinger, 1989), as Mickey Katz
 Malina (dir. Werner Schroeter, 1991), as Bulgarian
 Terror 2000: Germany Out of Control (dir. Christoph Schlingensief, 1992), as Körn
 The Last Summer of the Rich (2015, director)

References

External links

1949 births
2015 deaths
Austrian male film actors
Austrian male television actors
20th-century Austrian male actors
21st-century Austrian male actors
Austrian film directors
Austrian screenwriters
Austrian male screenwriters
Austrian film producers
Male actors from Vienna
German Film Award winners